Bakshi Ka Talab is a constituency of the Uttar Pradesh Legislative Assembly covering the city of Bakshi Ka Talab in the Lucknow district of Uttar Pradesh, India. Bakshi Ka Talab is one of five assembly constituencies in the Mohanlalganj Lok Sabha constituency. Since 2008, this assembly constituency is numbered 169 amongst 403 constituencies.

Members of Legislative Assembly

Election results

2022

2017
Bharatiya Janata Party candidate Avinash Trivedi won in 2017 Uttar Pradesh Legislative Elections defeating Bahujan Samaj Party candidate Nakul Dubey by a margin of 17,584 votes.

2012

References

External links
 

2017 establishments in Uttar Pradesh
Assembly constituencies of Uttar Pradesh
Politics of Lucknow district